The Ossietzky Award  is a prize awarded by the Norwegian chapter of P.E.N., for extraordinary contributions to freedom of speech.

The prize is named after writer and Nobel Peace Prize laureate Carl von Ossietzky.

Recipients 
 Aziz Nesin (1993) 
 Axel Jensen (1994) 
 Johanna Schwarz (1995) 
 Koigi wa Wamwere (1996)
 Haakon Børde (1997)
 Ketil Lund (1998) 
 Wera Sæther (1999) 
 Britt Karin Larsen (2000) 
 Sigmund Strømme (2001)
 Elisabeth Eide (2002)
 Stavanger Municipality (2003) 
 Aage Storm Borchgrevink (2004) 
 Fakhra Salimi (2005) 
 Ebba Haslund (2006) 
 Democratic Voice of Burma (2007) 
 Francis Sejersted and Chungdak Koren (2008) 
 Mohammed Omer (2009) 
 Mansour Koushan (2010) 
 Mohammad Mostafaei (2011) 
 Deeyah Khan (2012) 
 Sidsel Mørck (2013)
 Sidsel Wold (2014)
 Irina Scherbakowa (2014)
 Ulrik Imtiaz Rolfsen (2015) 
 Edward Snowden (2016)
 Tormod Heier (2017) 
Ahmedur Rashid Chowdhury (2018)
 Afshin Ismaeli (2019)
 Ahmed Falah, Finn Graff and Siri Dokken on behalf of satirists in Norway (2020)
 "Those who speak freely in Afghanistan" (2021)

References

External links 

 

Freedom of speech
Awards established in 1994
1994 establishments in Norway